Spring Brook is an unincorporated community in Spring Brook Township in Lackawanna County, Pennsylvania. Spring Brook is located at the intersection of state routes 502 and 690, southwest of Moscow.

References

Unincorporated communities in Lackawanna County, Pennsylvania
Unincorporated communities in Pennsylvania